Andrea Glass (born 17 July 1976) is a former professional German tennis player.

Her highest WTA singles ranking is 53rd, which she reached on 1 February 1999, as a result of reaching the third round of the Australian Open, where Anna Kournikova beat her 4–6, 6–2, 6–3. Her career high in doubles was at 85 set on 20 November 2000.

Glass won the German Tennis Championship in both singles and doubles, partnering Barbara Rittner, in 1997. She played for Germany in the Fed Cup from 1998 to 2001.

ITF finals

Singles (0–4)

Doubles (3–1)

External links
 
 
 

1976 births
Living people
German female tennis players
Sportspeople from Darmstadt
Tennis people from Hesse